Eva Dyrberg (born 17 February 1980) is a Danish  former tennis player. As a junior player, she won 1998 Wimbledon Championships with Jelena Kostanić and 1998 US Open with Kim Clijsters. In 1998, Dyrberg was also ranked World No. 1 in junior doubles and was named ITF Junior Girls Doubles World Champion. During her professional career, she won four singles and five doubles events organized by the International Tennis Federation, defeating players such as Magdalena Maleeva, Tathiana Garbin, Maria Elena Camerin, Nicole Pratt, and reaching one doubles final at WTA Tour, at Sanex Trophy in 2000. She retired from professional tennis after the 2003 Australian Open.

Personal life 
Dyrberg was born to Christian and Gunhild Dyrberg, and has a sister Anne. She began playing tennis aged six, admiring Steffi Graf. Dyrberg earned her high school degree in 1999. She is coached by Ola Kristiansson and former WTA Tour player Tine Scheuer-Larsen. Eva forms couple with the Investment Banker, Per Harald Dyrberg Mortensen.

Award 
 1998 — ITF Junior Girls Doubles World Champion

Career statistics

WTA Tour doubles finals (1; 1–0)

ITF Finals

Singles: 7 (4–3)

Doubles: 8 (5–3)

Grand Slam girls' doubles finals: 2 (2–0)

References

External links 
 
 

1980 births
Danish female tennis players
Living people
Sportspeople from Copenhagen
Wimbledon junior champions
US Open (tennis) junior champions
Grand Slam (tennis) champions in girls' doubles